Sudhanwa Debbarma (also spelt Sudhanya Debbarma) (26 February 1918 – 1999) was an Indian Kokborok writer, Political leader and member of the Communist Party of India (Marxist). He was the former Speaker of Tripura Legislative Assembly. He was the veteran leader of Ganamukti Parishad. He was a member of Tripura Legislative Assembly from Takarjala (Vidhan Sabha constituency) (1977-1988).

Early life
Debbarma hails from a small Indian state Tripura. He was born in a lower-middle-class family in Sutarmura village under Bishalgarh Sub-division, West Tripura district (present day Sepahijala district). He spent his primary school days in his village, after primary education he came to Agartala for higher education.  He completed his higher secondary education from Umakanta Academy. After higher secondary he went to Bangladesh for doing graduation.

Political career

Debbarma and other activists started revolution against Tripura king to spread education in Tiprasa population and they established Tripura Janasiksha Samiti in 1945. He was the founding president of the organization. The king issued arrest warrant against the Janashiksha Samity leaders and he was arrested and severely beaten up inside the jail. After Janashiksha Samity Sudhanwa and other leaders demanded the right to life and livelihood of the Tripuri people. On 15 August 1948, Sudhanwa, Dasarath Deb, Hemanta Debbarma, Bidya Debbarma and other leaders formed Ganamukti Parishad, this organization was formed against the torture of bureaucrats and police of Tripura. He was inspired by communist ideology. He became a member of the Communist Party of India.  When the Communist Party was divided in 1964, he took the side of the Communist Party of India (Marxist) and was elected to the Tripura state committee of the CPI(M). In 1977, Tripura Legislative Assembly election he was elected for the first time by CPI(M) ticket from Takarjala (Vidhan Sabha constituency).

Revolution

Tripura Janasiksha Samiti

On 27 December 1945 AD (11th Pousa of 1352 BE) the Tripura Janasiksha Samiti came into being at Durgachoudhury Para under the Jirania Block. This organisation was established by some enlightened Tripuri youths Dasarath Deb, Sudhanwa Debbarma, Hemanta Debbarma and others with an avowed object to set up schools and spread education among the children of the down-trodden Tripuris in the state of Tripura. At that time, the movement of the Janasiksha Samiti speedily transformed into a mass movement. 

In that time, the Maharaja Bir Bikram Kishore Debbarman's education minister Brown Sahib was compelled to open nearly three hundred schools in rural area. The Samiti could establish 488 primary schools in different remote areas of the state with the active co-operation.  Subsequently, in 1950–51, most of these schools were recognized by the State Government.

List of works
Sudhanwa wrote many novels, poems and short stories. The first Kokborok magazine "Kwtal Kothoma" was published by him in 1954 AD.

Novels

Poems

Drama

See also
 Dasarath Deb
 Bidya Debbarma
 Ganamukti Parishad

References

Bibliography
 
 
 
 
 

Speakers of the Tripura Legislative Assembly
1918 births
1999 deaths
Tripuri people
People from West Tripura district
Communist Party of India (Marxist) politicians from Tripura
Tripura politicians
Tripura MLAs 1977–1983
Tripura MLAs 1983–1988